L'uomo, la bestia e la virtù, internationally released as Man, Beast and Virtue, is a 1953 Italian comedy film directed by Steno. It starred Italian comedian Totò and famed actor Orson Welles. The film was originally shot in Gevacolor, but only black-and-white prints exist today.

Sergio Leone and Lucio Fulci were both assistant directors on this film. Fulci said the film did not really do well, but it gave Fulci his first screenwriting credit, and he really enjoyed being in Orson Welles' presence. Welles was in Italy filming Othello at the time, and Fulci said Welles' entire diet consisted of oranges which he ate in massive quantities. Fulci described Totò as being a very sad figure, and said Carlo Ponti forced him to star in this film against his will as Totò had signed a contract with the producer. Although filming went past the contracted period, Ponti never paid Orson Welles a penny in overtime either.

The film was based on the 1919 novel and play of the same name by Luigi Pirandello. Pirandello's heirs were very disappointed with the film, which they said omitted most of the bawdy humor and the theme of dressing the actors up in animal costumes was jettisoned by the producers, leaving behind an emasculated version of Pirandello's play. To make matters worse, the film vanished from sight for decades following its brief theatrical release, a black-and-white print only surfacing in the early 1990s, making it impossible to evaluate Mario Damicelli's much vaunted color cinematography.

Plot
Paolino (Totò) is in love with a married woman, Annarella (Viviane Romance). Both participate in a casual affair, but one day Annarella becomes pregnant. The woman's husband, Captain Perella (Orson Welles), suddenly returns after months away from home for work. In order to avoid the shame and disgrace of discovery, Paolino hatches a complex plot to ensure that Perella spends a night of pleasure with Annarella to disguise the origin of her pregnancy. Little do they know the Captain is recovering from a series of trysts with multiple mistresses while on his sea voyage. Paolino dresses Annarella in sexy attire to pique her husband's interest and even tries to get him to eat some cake laced with stimulants.

Cast
Totò as Paolino De Vico
Orson Welles as Captain Perella
Viviane Romance as Assunta Perella
Franca Faldini as Mariannina
Mario Castellani as The doctor
Clelia Matania as Grazia
Giancarlo Nicotra as Nonò
Carlo Delle Piane as The student

References

External links

1953 comedy films
1953 films
Italian comedy films
Italian films based on plays
Lux Film films
Films based on works by Luigi Pirandello
Films directed by Stefano Vanzina
1950s Italian films